T. C. Poonen (1847–1901) was a Travancorean judge and Member of Legislative Council.

Early life and education 
Poonen was born into the Saint Thomas Anglican family of Therakathu, in Kottayam, Travancore. He began schooling at the C.MS College School in Kottayam. In 1864, he matriculated from the Government Provincial School of Calicut.

In 1869, he earned a BA from Presidency College, Madras. The same year, he was awarded a government scholarship for higher studies and moved to England. T. C. Poonen has the distinction of being the first Malayalee to be educated in Britain.

Legal and business career 
After qualifying as a lawyer, Poonen was called to the Bar of England and Wales from the Inner Temple, in 1872. However, he chose to return to Travancore.

In the nineteenth century, the high offices of Travancore government were reserved for high caste Hindus, because they were also required to supervise the temples and feeding houses (Oottu Puras) for Brahmins. So, T. C. Poonen was refused a government job, in accordance to his merit. Thus, for sometime, he practiced law, as a barrister, in Tellicherri. However, in 1876, he received posting as a judge, in the neighbouring Princely State of Cochin. He retired in 1894 and started the first wholly Travancore bank, in Kottayam. But, the bank failed.

Political career 
In April 1898, leading Syrian Christians of all sects, formed the Travancore and Cochin Christian Association, to promote their interests and to deal with the discriminatory policies of the government. Barrister Poonen was its first President. In 1899, T. C. Poonen succeeded K. K. Kuruvilla, as the only Saint Thomas Christian representative to the Travancore Legislative Council (precursor to Sree Moolam Popular Assembly), constituted by Maharajah Moolam Thirunal Rama Varma.

Under the leadership of T. C. Poonen, the Travancore and Cochin Christian Association submitted a memorial to Dewan K. Krishnaswamy Rao, demanding the dissociation of temple duties from executive offices, competitive exams for higher government posts and a more representative composition of administration. As the Dewan wasn't sympathetic, the association approached Viceroy Lord Curzon, on his visit to Travancore, in November 1900. But he declined to interfere in regional affairs.

T. C. Poonen died in 1901; but the causes that he and several of his contemporaries stood for, did not. The various socio-political movements that began from late 19th century, transformed Travancore, and it's administration became much more inclusive and representative in the 20th century.

References

Bibliography 

 
 
 
 
 
 
 
 

1847 births
1901 deaths
University of Madras alumni
Indian barristers
19th-century Indian lawyers
19th-century Indian politicians
Malayali politicians
Indian caste leaders
Saint Thomas Christians
Indian Anglicans
People of the Kingdom of Travancore